HD 4732 is a red giant star of magnitude 5.9 located in the constellation Cetus. It is 189 light years from the Solar System.

HD 4732 is located in the celestial Southern Hemisphere, although it can be observed from most regions of the Earth. Near Antarctica the star is circumpolar, while it is always below the horizon near the Arctic. Its magnitude of 5.9 places it at the limit of visibility to the naked eye, so observing this star with the naked eye is possible a clear sky and no Moon.

The best time to observe this star in the evening sky falls in the months between September and February, and from both hemispheres the period of visibility remains approximately the same, thanks to the star's position not far from the celestial equator.

The star is a red giant with an absolute magnitude of 2.14, and its radial velocity indicates that the star is moving away from the Solar System.

Planetary system
In November 2012 a double planetary system was announced orbiting around this star from radial velocity measurements at Okayama Astrophysical Observatory and Australian Astronomical Observatory. The planetary system has two giant planets with identical minimum masses of 2.4  times that of Jupiter with orbital periods of 360 days and 2732 days. The maximum mass of the planets cannot exceed 28 times that of Jupiter based on dynamical stability analysis for the system, if the planets are coplanar  and prograde.

The planetary system of HD 4732 was found to be stable in 2019.

See also
Okayama Planet Search Program

References

External links
Star Simbad data from the archive
Data on the star system from the site Vizier

Cetus (constellation)
K-type giants
004732
0228
Planetary systems with two confirmed planets
003834
Durchmusterung objects
J00491393-2408119